Tactostoma macropus, the longfin dragonfish, is a species of barbeled dragonfish found in the Pacific Ocean down to depths of .  This species grows to a length of  TL.  This species is the only known species in the genus Tactostoma.

References
 

Stomiidae
Taxa named by Rolf Ling Bolin
Fish described in 1939